İslambeyli is a  village in Pınarhisar district of Kırklareli Province, Turkey,  It is situated in the Eastern Thrace plains at . The population of the village is 295 as of 2011. The old name of this village is Urumbeyli. It was a Bulgarian village during the Ottoman Empire era. But after the Second Balkan War the Bulgarian population was forced to leave the settlement.

References

Villages in Pınarhisar District